Quizás (English: Maybe) is the sixth studio album and fourth full-Spanish-language album by Spanish singer-songwriter Enrique Iglesias. The album was released by Universal Music Latino on 17 September 2002.

Quizás was Iglesias first album in Spanish in four years, his last being Cosas del Amor in 1998. This was also his last full-length Spanish album of his career as his next albums would be English and bilingual exclusively. The album has a fragile and delicate sound compared to his previous three Spanish albums, which were based on pop songs with light rock instrumentation and consists mainly of middle of the road Latin pop ballads. It is his most personal release to date as it deals with topics such as the strange relationship with his father, singer Julio Iglesias, and other personal dilemmas.

Enrique Iglesias won the Latin Grammy Award for Best Male Pop Vocal Album at the 4th Annual Latin Grammy Awards on 3 September 2003.

Making of Quizás
Enrique Iglesias wrote or co-wrote every track on the album and co-produced several of the tracks with the exception of "Tres Palabras" and the cover version of "La Chica de Ayer" originally recorded by Nacha Pop. Iglesias was the executive producer of the album alongside best friend Andrés Restrepo. The title track of the album talks about Iglesias' strained relationship with his father. The album was released on 17 September 2002.

Commercial performance
Quizas topped the Billboard Latin Albums Chart, debuting at No. 1 and shot to No. 12 on the Billboard 200, the highest position for a Spanish album at the time and fastest-selling Spanish album in five years. All three singles released from the album ("Mentiroso", "Quizás" and "Para Qué La Vida") topped Billboard's Hot Latin Tracks Chart. In Spain however the first single "Mentiroso" was not released. In its place, the song "La Chica de Ayer" was released as promotional single. The album also entered at 200 on the UK album charts, the highest entry for a Spanish album that year as well as performing well across Latin America going platinum in counties like Mexico and Argentina. The album has sold 1 million copies worldwide.

Track listing

Charts

Certifications and sales

References

2002 albums
Enrique Iglesias albums
Universal Music Latino albums
Spanish-language albums
Latin Grammy Award for Best Male Pop Vocal Album